Marmorofusus michaelrogersi is a species of sea snail, a marine gastropod mollusk in the family Fasciolariidae, the spindle snails, the tulip snails and their allies.

Description

Distribution
Marmorofusus michaelrogersi can be found in Pacific waters, ranging from Hawaii to Midway Island.

References

 Goodwin D.R. (2001). A new species of Fusinus from the north-western Hawaiian Islands. Bulletin of the Institute of Malacology, Tokyo. 3(8): 115-117
 Callomon P., Snyder M.A. & Severns M. (2018). Observations on the genus Fusinus in Hawaii (Gastropoda: Fasciolariidae). Novapex. 19(3): 67-81.

michaelrogersi
Gastropods described in 2001